Claudia Biene is a Paralympian athlete from Germany competing mainly in category F42 throwing events.

Claudia won a silver medal in the F42-46 discus at the 2004 Summer Paralympics in Athens where she also competed in the javelin and long jump.  Four years later in Beijing she competed in the same three events and the 100m but failed to win a medal in any of them.

External links
 profile on paralympic.org

Paralympic athletes of Germany
Athletes (track and field) at the 2004 Summer Paralympics
Athletes (track and field) at the 2008 Summer Paralympics
Paralympic silver medalists for Germany
Living people
World record holders in Paralympic athletics
Medalists at the 2004 Summer Paralympics
Year of birth missing (living people)
Paralympic medalists in athletics (track and field)
German female discus throwers
German female javelin throwers
German female long jumpers
21st-century German women